Cory Michael Schlesinger (born June 23, 1972)  is a former American football fullback of the National Football League (NFL). He was drafted by the Detroit Lions in the sixth round of the 1995 NFL Draft. He played college football at Nebraska.

Early years
Schlesinger was a two-time all-state selection at linebacker at Columbus High School, leading the team in tackles as a junior and senior. He also played fullback as a senior in 1990. For the season, he rushed for 1,514 yards and 23 touchdowns (including nine 100-yard games). He was named the Nebraska Defensive Player of the Year as a prep senior and played with a group of Nebraska football all-stars in the Down Under Bowl in Sydney, Australia following his senior season.

He also won the 189-pound wrestling state championship twice during his prep career.

College career
Schlesinger was a two-year starter for the Nebraska Cornhuskers. As a junior, he was the 1993 Husker Co-Lifter-of-the-Year with linebacker Donta Jones. During that season he finished as the team's fifth-leading rusher with 48 carries for 193 yards and one touchdown.

He earned All-Big Eight honorable mention honors in 1994 in a coaches poll and a Phillips 66 Academic All-Big Eight pick the same year. Schlesinger scored two fourth-quarter touchdowns in the 1995 Orange Bowl in a 24–17 win over the Miami Hurricanes as a senior to secure Nebraska's first national title under then-head coach Tom Osborne.

He would finish second on the team in rushing in 1994 with 456 yards and four touchdowns including 7.2 yards-per-carry.

Professional career

Detroit Lions
Schlesinger was drafted by the Detroit Lions in the sixth round (192nd overall) of the 1995 NFL Draft. He started two of the team's first three games during his rookie season at fullback blocking for Barry Sanders, but playing time in the backfield diminished soon thereafter when the offense began employing three-receiver sets on almost every play from scrimmage. He finished second on the team with 15 special teams tackles. In 1996, he was primarily used on special teams, leading the club with 13 tackles on the year. In 1997, he split time at fullback with Tommy Vardell and saw more action there than in previous years with the Lions with the team moving to a predominantly two-back set. He again played on special teams, finishing second on team with 27 tackles. He was the backup to Vardell at most times during the  1998 season but did see playing time in the backfield. He served as one of squad's most productive special teams players for a fourth consecutive season, with his 18 tackles ranking fifth on the Lions. On offense, he was part of team's "jumbo" package at goal-line and in short-yardage with he and Vardell sharing the backfield. In 1999, he became the Lions' full-time starting fullback, replacing Vardell. He also finished third on the team with 15 special teams tackles. Schlesinger was named as a member of the 1999 All-Madden team and filmed a sketch for the show in a Lincoln, Nebraska grocery store where he repeatedly crashed into other shoppers with his cart.

In 2000, Schlesinger played in all 16 games for the fifth time in six NFL seasons and second year as the Lions' starting fullback. His 15 special teams tackles tied for fifth on squad as well. In 2001, the Lions named Marty Mornhinweg head coach and the team moved away from a power rushing attack to the west coast offense. The fullback, in addition to rushing and blocking responsibilities, can also be more involved in the passing game. Schlesinger finished the 2001 season with single-season career highs in rushing attempts (47), rushing yards (154), rushing touchdowns (three), receptions (60), and receiving yards (466). On the year Schlesinger rushed for 16 first downs, the only season of his career he accumulated a double-digit total in the category. For his efforts during the season, he was voted the Chuck Hughes Most Improved Player by teammates and was also voted onto Howie Long's Tough Guy team. He was also named to the 2001 All-Pro Team by Sports Illustrateds Paul Zimmerman and to the College and Pro Football Newsweekly 2001 All-Pro Second-team squad. In 2002, he finished the year with 139 rushing yards and two rushing touchdowns along with 35 receptions for 263 yards. He was an alternate in the 2002 Pro Bowl to starter Mike Alstott. He was also the Detroit Lions recipient of the 2002 Ed Block Courage Award.

In 2003, Schlesinger was voted by his teammates as the Bobby Layne Offensive Most Valuable Player (MVP) Award winner and as the Mike Utley Spirit Award winner. He was an alternate in the 2003 Pro Bowl to starter Alstott. In 2004, he was named as an alternate to the 2005 Pro Bowl for the third-straight season. He finished the season with a career-high three receiving touchdowns. He was a 2004 Pro Bowl alternate to starter Fred Beasley. Schlesinger missed the first portion of the 2005 season after suffering a fractured left fibula in preseason opener at New York Jets on August 12. Schlesinger was the 2005 recipient of the Detroit Lions/Detroit Sports Broadcasters Association/Pro Football Writers Association's Media-Friendly "Good Guy" Award. In 2006, he appeared in 14 games with four starts to record eight catches for 36 yards (4.5 avg). He was inactive with a hamstring injury at the New York Jets on October 22 and against the Atlanta Falcons on November 5. He returned to the lineup against the San Francisco 49ers on November 12 to play in his 174th career game, which moved him into a tie for seventh with placekicker Eddie Murray (1980–1991) on the team's all-time games played list.

In 2007, Schlesinger signed with the Miami Dolphins on March 11, 2007 in anticipation he would become the lead blocker for running back Ronnie Brown. However, he was released at the end of training camp, losing out to rookie sixth-round draft pick Reagan Mauia.

Career statistics

Personal life
While in high school, Schlesinger drove in demolition derbies for three years. He completed a degree in industrial technology education at the University of Nebraska and spent parts of the 1995–1997 off-seasons as a student teacher at Park Middle School in Lincoln, Nebraska and taught at his alma mater during the 1998–1999 off-seasons. Since 2008, he has been a computer-aided design and drafting teacher at Allen Park High School in Allen Park, Michigan.

He and his wife have two daughters.

References

External links
 Detroit Lions Bio

1972 births
Living people
American football fullbacks
Nebraska Cornhuskers football players
Detroit Lions players
Miami Dolphins players
People from Columbus, Nebraska
Ed Block Courage Award recipients